Artur Bogusz (born 18 April 1993) is a Polish professional footballer who plays as a full-back for Chrobry Głogów.

Honours

Club
Radomiak Radom
I liga: 2020–21

References

Polish footballers
1993 births
Living people
Association football defenders
Tur Turek players
Wigry Suwałki players
Olimpia Zambrów players
ŁKS Łódź players
Radomiak Radom players
Chrobry Głogów players
Ekstraklasa players
I liga players
III liga players